The 1892 Livingstone football team represented Livingstone College in the 1892 college football season as an independent. 

On December 27 of 1892, Livingstone College and Biddle College, (Johnson C. Smith) University played in the snows of Salisbury, North Carolina, just two days after Christmas. A writer of a story in the 1930 year-book of Livingstone College provided a glimpse of that December experience when the team from Biddle Institute traveled to Livingstone's Old Delta Grove campus in Salisbury to play while writers recorded the results of a historic moment in sports history.

According to historian T.M. Martin, the men of Biddle spent two years studying and practicing the sport of football. In 1892, they challenged the men of Livingstone, whose team was formally organized in the fall of that year.

Schedule

References

Livingstone
Livingstone Blue Bears football seasons
Livingstone football